Eupithecia semicalva is a moth in the family Geometridae. It is found in China (Sichuan).

References

Moths described in 1979
semicalva
Moths of Asia